Peter Chung (born April 19, 1961) is a Korean American animator. He is best known for his unique style of animation, as the creator and director of Æon Flux and Reign: The Conqueror (Alexander Senki).

Early life and career
Peter Chung was born on April 19, 1961. Since his father was in the foreign service of the Republic of Korea, he has lived in Seoul, London, Nairobi, Washington, D.C., New York and Tunis. His parents then immigrated to the United States; he lived in McLean, Virginia. Chung studied animation at California Institute of the Arts (CalArts) from 1979 to 1981, one year at the Character Animation program, and another year in the program in Experimental Animation.

Chung started his animation career at a small animation studio in Maryland at age 18, working for animator and illustrator Salvador Bru.  From there at age 19 he was designing characters for Hanna-Barbera. About this time he also started working on the layout and animation on Ralph Bakshi's Fire and Ice before being hired by Disney for feature development.

Directing credits
In addition to Æon Flux (3 seasons: 1991, 1992, 1995), Chung's directing credits include the Matriculated segment from The Animatrix, and The Chronicles of Riddick: Dark Fury.  Chung served as lead character designer for the animated series, Teenage Mutant Ninja Turtles (1987), C.O.P.S. (1988) Phantom 2040 (1994–1996) and Reign: The Conqueror (1999). The designs feature lean angular characters inspired by the art of Egon Schiele, a look which has become Chung's trademark character design. He also, along with Arlene Klasky and Gabor Csupo, co-designed the characters in the Nickelodeon series Rugrats, and co-directed its pilot, "Tommy Pickles and The Great White Thing" and the opening sequence. In addition, in 2007 he directed the opening three-part episode for GameTaps' Revisioned: Tomb Raider, entitled "Keys to the Kingdom".

He has also directed some television advertisements – available at Peter Chung at Acme Filmworks – including a Diet Pepsi advertisement featuring Cindy Crawford and Malcolm McDowell.

, among other unannounced projects, he was working on a full-length animated feature entitled Luvula. He is also director of the television adaption of Firebreather for Cartoon Network. Mr. Chung has also expressed interest in creating a new direct-to-video animated feature of Æon Flux.

Animation style and influences
Chung names Japanese animation, German expressionism and European comics as his influence, in particular the illustrative quality of the art that depends on expressive drawings instead of many surface details. He names in his influences expressionist Egon Schiele and comic artist Moebius. As narrative influence he names Kazuo Umezu, Sanpei Shirato, Osamu Tezuka, Jack Kirby, Moebius, Alejandro Jodorowsky, Schuiten and Peeters, Silvio Cadelo, Tatsuya Egawa, Geof Darrow and Frank Miller. He also names as influences, in no special order: David Lynch, Stanley Kubrick, Orson Welles, Alfred Hitchcock, Federico Fellini, Michelangelo Antonioni, Alain Resnais, Jean Cocteau, Alain Robbe-Grillet, Seijun Suzuki, Yoshiaki Kawajiri, Yoshinori Kanada, Horst Janssen, and Frank Lloyd Wright.

Chung's animation, particularly Æon Flux and Matriculated, tends toward the artistically and thematically experimental.

In the animation field, he admires Yoshinori Kanada, Koji Morimoto, and Igor Kovalyov.

Ralph Bakshi, one of the first to hire Chung, has stated that one of Chung's favorite artists is Toulouse-Lautrec.

Chung was one of the artists working on the Underground roleplaying game (1993) from Mayfair Games, and author Shannon Appelcline felt that Aeon Flux "was a clear influence" on the game.

In an April 2019 interview with Diego Molano, creator of Victor & Valentino, he said that he was fascinated with Chung's Aeon Flux and how he uses movement to tell a story even without dialogue. He even paused the show and put tracing paper over Chung's drawings, and then sold them at school, showing how Chung's style influenced him. Later, Chung would become the animation director on Victor & Valentino, which Molano was "greatly thankful for."

Personal life
Chung has also been a participant in online forums, where users have asked him about his work and creative process. Two of the more prominent forums are ILX and Monican Spies.

Chung currently teaches a Master Class at the Division of Animation and Digital Arts at the USC School of Cinematic Arts since Spring 2013.

Quotes

 "For me, a degree of ambiguity, or mystery, is the key ingredient of any artistic statement."
"I often remind myself that animation is the creation of the illusion of spontaneity. Because nothing is in fact less spontaneous than the process of animating."
"The task of the animator, to breathe life into his characters, requires concentration akin to that of an actor whose performance has been entirely scripted down."

Filmography 
 Fire and Ice (1983) (film) - Animator, layout artist
 The Transformers (1984) (TV series) - Storyboard artist
 The Transformers: The Movie (1986) (film) - Storyboard artist
 Teenage Mutant Ninja Turtles (1987) (TV series) - Art direction, opening title design
 C.O.P.S. (1988) (TV series) - Character design, opening title direction, overseas animation supervision
 Ring Raiders (1989) (TV series) - Character design
 Rugrats (1991) (TV series) - Animator: main title animation, pilot, character design
 Phantom 2040 (1994) (TV series) - Character design
 Æon Flux (1995) (TV series) -	Creator, director, producer, scripts, character design
 The Rugrats Movie (1998) (film) - Storyboards
 Alexander Senki (1999) aka Alexander the Great (international) and Reign: The Conqueror (USA) (TV series) - Character design and original design
 Party 7 (2000) (film) - Animator: credit sequence
 The Animatrix (2003) (short) (Matriculated segment) - Director, script, design
 The Chronicles of Riddick: Dark Fury (2004) (OVA) - Director, character designer
 Revisioned: Tomb Raider (2007) (web series) (first episode which is split into 3 parts) - Director, script, design
 Firebreather (2010) (film) - Director
 Diablo III: Wrath (2012) (film) - Director
 Victor & Valentino (2019) (TV series) - Main title

References

External links

 
 Peter Chung at Acme Filmworks
 AWN gallery
 CATSUKA-Peter Chung Detailed work history, as well as illustrations and videos of Chung's work. 
 La Cinémathèque de Toulouse - Colloque

Interviews
 University of Michigan presentation October 5, 2006.
 Interview with Peter Chung by Ed Stastny
 Suicide Girls interview
 Animation Arena Interview. Done between the release of The Animatrix and Dark Fury.
 Bright Lights Film interview
 Barnes & Noble interview
 LJ monican spies interview January 4, 2006.
 The Collective Podcast, Episode 134  —  Peter Chung August 15, 2016  –  2 hours, 22 mins

1961 births
Living people
American film directors of Korean descent
South Korean film directors
South Korean animated film directors
American animated film directors
American animators
American storyboard artists
Advertising directors
American art directors
American television writers
American male television writers
Film and television title designers
California Institute of the Arts alumni